Fluke was an English electronic music group formed in the late 1980s by Mike Bryant, Jon Fugler and Mike Tournier. The band were noted for their diverse range of electronic styles, including house, techno, ambient, big beat and downtempo; for their reclusivity, rarely giving interviews; and for lengthy timespans between albums. 

Fluke produced five original studio albums, three compilation albums, and a live album. They made several line-up changes over the years, with credited appearances attributed to Neil Davenport on guitars, Robin Goodridge on drums and Hugh Bryder as a DJ. In the tour for their fourth album Risotto (1997), they were joined on stage by singer Rachel Stewart, who continued as lead female vocalist and dancer for all of Fluke's live performances between 1997 and 1999.

After Risotto, Tournier left the group to form Syntax with Jan Burton. Bryant and Fugler went on to produce Fluke's fifth and final studio album, Puppy (2003), and the pair subsequently engaged in a project under the name 2 Bit Pie, with their first album 2Pie Island released in September 2006.

Fluke received mainstream attention through the inclusion of their music in various film and video game soundtracks, including blockbuster films like The Matrix Reloaded (2003) and Sin City (2005), and the soundtracks to the video game series Need for Speed: Underground and Wipeout. The film The Experiment (2010) uses their song "YKK" from Puppy.

History

The Techno Rose of Blighty
Before forming Fluke, Fugler and Bryant had played in two punk bands together named The Leaky Radiators and The Layfigures. The third member of Fluke, Tournier, was introduced to the group when he undertook work on a collaboration with Fugler entitled "Skin". It soon became clear that all three shared musical tastes, having a shared interest in the acid house scene and the more experimental electronic sounds of Cabaret Voltaire and Giorgio Moroder.

Fluke's first single, released in 1988, was a white label vinyl entitled "Island Life", pressed on a clear blue 12" vinyl record. Although a commercial failure, as well as being very different in sound to the band's later works, the group persisted and released another two white label vinyls: "Thumper!" in 1989 and "Joni/Taxi" in 1990, a song that sampled Joni Mitchell's "Big Yellow Taxi". The attention that these records received gained the band a record deal with Creation Records with whom they released their first CD single "Philly" in the same year.

In the following year, Fluke released their first album, The Techno Rose of Blighty, swiftly followed by the single "The Bells" and a live album entitled Out (In Essence). For the release of Out (In Essence), Fluke abandoned their deal with Creation Records and signed instead with Circa Records, an offshoot of Virgin. Along with these releases, Fluke also began their career-spanning tradition of releasing work of a different nature under various names. The first of these, the industrial music single "All Aboard", was released in 1990 under the name The Lucky Monkeys.

At this early stage in their career, the band realized that they would experience the greatest artistic freedom if they had their own recording studio and took it upon themselves to obtain their own premises. This was an asset which, according to Fugler, proved invaluable in coordinating the "wider pool of people — musicians and friends — that we draw on to help".

Although having never met the band, EMI invited Fluke to remix Talk Talk's 1986 song "Life's What You Make It" for the 1991 album History Revisited which largely consists of new remixes of Talk Talk songs. The album was removed from stores after the band denounced it, saying they had not given permission for the songs to be remixed.

Six Wheels on My Wagon
After a two-year break, Fluke returned with what became a breakthrough into mainstream popular music when, in 1993, they released the single "Slid". This became an instant club classic when it was picked up by DJ Sasha who liked it so much that he included three separate remixes of it on his Renaissance album. This burst of success was followed by two further singles, "Electric Guitar" and "Groovy Feeling", and, in the same year, the release of the group's second album, Six Wheels on My Wagon.

This new album was a distinctly house music production, with uplifting riffs and ambient effects, as opposed to the techno style of their previous release. The album was structured so that the more accessible "pop" tracks were to be found at the beginning of the album and the more ambitious ambient works towards the end. Though this could have produced a stagnating effect, it was received favourably by critics, with Billboard magazine labelling it "groundbreaking". Other reviewers went further, with The Independent suggesting that Fluke was to become the next big thing in Europe:

In 1994, Fluke released The Peel Sessions, recorded for the BBC Radio 1 DJ John Peel. This CD was a selection of tracks from two live sessions recorded on 18 November 1990 and 10 December 1991. The CD included one new song, "Time Keeper", and several tracks which had previously been released on vinyl only. Fluke were invited to perform two further, unreleased, Peel Sessions after this CD. One was broadcast on 10 November 1996 and the other was performed live on 8 December 2002.

Oto, Risotto and departure of Mike Tournier
The following year, Fluke released their third album, Oto, which is the Greek word for "of the ear". In terms of style, Oto was somewhat darker than Six Wheels on my Wagon, focusing on the downbeat ambient effects which were present in the second half of Six Wheels, and the band completely removed the uplifting house style that characterised their previous work. Owing to the decreased accessibility of the album as a result of this, only two singles were deemed suitable for release from Oto; "Bullet" and "Tosh". In spite of this, "Bullet" was chosen by Dominic Pride of Billboard magazine as one of his top ten picks of 1995.  

In 1996, Fluke released "Atom Bomb", a single that reached #20 in the UK charts. Originally created as a track for the video game Wipeout 2097 (Along with "V6"), it became the centrepiece of their next album, Risotto. The track was also released as a single from the soundtrack album Wipeout 2097: The Soundtrack, which had tracks from The Chemical Brothers, Future Sound of London, Photek, Underworld, Daft Punk, Leftfield and The Prodigy. Of all their productions, it is Fluke's fourth studio album which is most widely known, primarily because it represented the pinnacle of Fluke's mainstream chart success with the singles "Atom Bomb" and "Absurd". The album was named Risotto after the risotto food dish because, like its culinary counterpart, it contained a mix of "ingredients". These included the singles "Atom Bomb" and "Absurd", new tracks "Goodnight Lover" and "Kitten Moon", the post-album single "Squirt" and reworked older tracks such as "Mosh", a remix of "Tosh" from Oto. Risotto was perhaps the most favourably reviewed of all Fluke's albums with David Bennun of The Guardian writing:

At this time, the band saw fit to re-use the Lucky Monkeys name for the release of "Bjango", a single which included a remix by Fluke themselves.

After touring for a year with Risotto on the American "Electric Highway Tour", and having made two appearances at the Glastonbury festival in 1995 and 1998, Tournier decided to leave the group to pursue a different project named Syntax, with the band's long standing friend, Jan Burton. They produced just a single album, Meccano Mind in March 2004, which in turn produced two moderately successful singles and a live tour supporting Scissor Sisters.

Progressive History X and Progressive History XXX
After Tournier's departure, it was decided to release two "Best Of" albums, Progressive History X, a compilation spanning their entire ten year producing history, and, in 2001, Progressive History XXX, a three CD box-set including many rare and hard to find mixes. Both releases were packaged with artwork from "Just Your Average Second On This Planet" 1997–1998, Discotheque by David Bethell The box-set contained black, red, white and blue versions of the same original cover art, and had a poster of the silhouette image on one side and all other album covers on the back.

In 2002, The Fluke DJs were formed, a live-show pairing of Fugler and Hugh Bryder. Bryder was a DJ who had assisted Fluke in their live performances since 1993 as well as working with other DJs such as Seb Fontaine while holding a DJ residency at MTV's special event parties. This seemed to indicate further rifts within the band as this DJ combination included neither Bryant nor Tournier. However, Fugler denied these rumours shortly after they surfaced claiming that the band merely needed some time away from each other after their intense work on Risotto.

Puppy
Even with the release of the "best of" albums, there were still signs of life in Fluke's production studio when, in 2000, they produced a promotional CD named The Xmas Demos, which included early versions of many of the tracks intended for the album Puppy. Speculation about a new album was furthered when, in 2003, the remaining members of Fluke released two singles forming the basis of this next album. Though the aptly titled "Slap It: The Return" signaled a break from the past, with the writing credits listed simply as "Bryant/Fugler" under the Appalooso label, "Pulse" exemplified a much darker style and was released on the One Little Indian label. In 2003, Fluke finally released their fifth studio album and first without Tournier, Puppy, six years after Risotto. The name of the album was inspired by Jeff Koons' fifty foot sculpture of a puppy that stands outside the Guggenheim museum in Bilbao. This album proved to be similar to the earlier Risotto tracks in tempo and mood, but with the introduction of some new ideas, such as the inclusion of a blues track, "Blue Sky", and a very dark techno orientated bonus track, "Pulse".

The album was not received well critically with most of the critics labelling the album as dated. Andy Gill of The Independent wrote:

The only single to be released from Puppy after the album's release was "Switch", which was released in CD and vinyl formats. The track was used on the soundtrack for the Electronic Arts video game Need For Speed Underground 2 but achieved nowhere near the critical or popular acclaim of the singles from Risotto, not even appearing in the UK top 40.

2005 onwards
In late 2005, Bryant and Fugler teamed up with Jan Burton, Wild Oscar, Robin Goodridge, Dilshani Weerasinghe, Marli Buck and producer Andy Gray to form 2 Bit Pie with a limited release of "Nobody Never". This track retained the rough vocals and electronic feel that was by now characteristic of Fluke, but had a stronger emphasis on live playback and real instruments. In May 2006, there were club previews of two new 2 Bit Pie songs, "Little Things" and "Here I Come". On 4 September 2006, 2 Bit Pie released their first album, 2Pie Island, in the UK to minimal critical attention. No further albums were released.

In 2009, Fluke briefly reunited for a live performance, including all three original members, with a show at The Tabernacle in London on 10 October 2009.

Mainstream popularity
Although Fluke produced music for the better part of two decades, they remained relatively unknown to a large scale audience and the band members themselves are even less recognizable. Fugler insisted in an interview with The Independent that the band's reclusivity was "less about selfish hedonism" than the revival of "a communal attitude that had long been forgotten." The main sphere in which the band had success is through their inclusion in advertisements, film and video game soundtracks. Among the more prominent of these appearances was the 2003 film, The Matrix Reloaded, using the Fluke track "Slap It" (also, "Another Kind of Blues") renamed to Zion for compatibility with the film.

Fluke's 1997 hit "Absurd" was used in the trailer for the 2000 remake of Get Carter, in the strip club sequence of the 2005 film Sin City and the 'Whitewash Edit' is included on the Lara Croft: Tomb Raider soundtrack which tied in with a commercial deal for Ericsson who sponsored the film and then went on to use "Absurd" in its commercials. In addition, it was used in the video game series NFL QB Club until its discontinuation in 2002. In the "Knight to King's Pawn" episode of the 2008 series of Knight Rider, the song "Absurd" was used by KITT to hide a secret message. "Absurd" is also used as the main theme for Sky Sports''' Monday Night Football program first from August 1997 to May 1998 and since August 2010 to the current day. Where possible Fluke's licensing agent, David Steel at V2 Music, tried to ensure that when their tracks are used in films they also appear on the soundtrack album:

This kind of exposure was welcomed by members of the band, as Fugler said in an interview with Billboard:

In 1997, Fluke's US sales totalled 14,000 which was modest compared with the 200,000 copies of Dig Your Own Hole that The Chemical Brothers sold. In an interview with Billboard magazine, Fugler said that he felt that predicted figures for the US electronica boom were overhyped by people who were out of touch with the music scene. "The expectations came from the people who [had] nothing to do with the music, it came from the business level, people not involved with it." This lack of commercial success has not dampened the spirits of the band however, Fugler going on to say, "It’s not about being on the cover of a magazine."

Live performances
Fluke's live shows were in many respects similar to the live performances given by The Chemical Brothers in that both employ stunning visual effects combining lasers and projected displays. Furthermore, Fluke's performances came in two varieties of show: performances as Fluke where the shows consist of entirely original Fluke material and shows under the alias "The Fluke DJs" where a combination of Fluke tracks are mixed with others in the style of a DJ set. Unable to attract major crowds, Fluke resorted to "festival-style" tours along with other acts to draw in a sizeable audience, as was seen with their participation in the "Electric Highway" tour in 1997 where they were joined by The Crystal Method and the "Pukkelpop" festival where they headlined with Metallica among others.

When Fluke was touring for Risotto they were joined on stage by Rachel Stewart who acted as a personification of the band's official mascot, a character from the Wipeout series named Arial Tetsuo. Stewart continued as lead female vocalist and as a dancer for all of Fluke's live performances between 1997 and 1999.

While Bryant remained on keyboards and programming and with only Davenport being the constant touring member on guitars, Fugler and Stewart were able to motivate the crowd visually with vocals and dancing while Fluke's resident lighting technician, Andy Walton, provided a suitable technology-driven accompaniment to the music. In 2004, Stewart left Fluke indefinitely, instead focusing on a new project with EMF band member James Atkin, named Beauty School.

The number of Fluke's live shows decreased significantly after the release of Puppy owing to their personal commitments to young families. In the few shows since, they have opted for the Fluke DJs set up, which uses "a battery of laptops and the odd deck" rather than focusing on their live band, an approach which Fugler subsequently referred to as "good fun, but ultimately flawed for the dancefloor."

Members
Band
 Mike Bryant - engineering, clarinet, bass, production (1988-1999) composer, programming (2000-2010)
 Jon Fugler - vocals, lyrics, production (1988-2009)
 Mike Tournier - composer, keyboards, guitar, programming, production (1988-1999)

Selected discographyThe Techno Rose of Blighty (1991)Six Wheels on My Wagon (1993)Oto (1995)Risotto (1997)Puppy'' (2003)

References

External links

Discogs
Marcolphus' Discographies
Global Trance & Dance

Astralwerks artists
English electronic music groups
English techno music groups
English house music groups
Intelligent dance musicians
British industrial music groups
English dance music groups
British musical trios
Musical groups from Buckinghamshire
Creation Records artists
One Little Independent Records artists
Remixers